Shaun Abreu (born January 8, 1991) is a Dominican American politician and tenants' rights attorney from New York City. He is a member of the Democratic Party serving as the city councilman for the 7th district of the New York City Council.

Early life and education
Abreu was born in Washington Heights, Manhattan, the son of immigrants from the Dominican Republic. His mother was a clerk at Zabar's, and his father was a union member and a janitor at Port Authority Bus Terminal. At nine years old, his family was evicted from their home, forcing them to stay with neighbors.

Abreu graduated from George Washington High School in Washington Heights, and went on to receive a degree in political science and government from Columbia University and a J.D. degree from Tulane University Law School. After graduating law school in 2018, he became a tenants' rights attorney with the New York Legal Assistance Group.

Career
While still a student at Columbia, Abreu worked as Mark Levine's deputy campaign manager during Levine's successful 2013 campaign for the New York City Council. He also served as a member of Manhattan Community Board 9.

2021 City Council campaign
In November 2020, Abreu announced his 2021 campaign to succeed the term-limited Levine in the City Council's 7th district, which covers Morningside Heights, Manhattan Valley, Hamilton Heights, and parts of Harlem and Washington Heights. Garnering endorsements from Levine, U.S. Congressman Adriano Espaillat, and most of the city's major unions, Abreu was regarded as the frontrunner in the race.

Five of Abreu's eleven opponents – Maria Ordoñez, Stacy Lynch, Marti Allen-Cummings, Dan Cohen, and Corey Ortega – sought to counter this advantage through ranked-choice voting and formed a coalition, wherein each of the five candidates advised their own voters to rank the other four coalition members on their ballot.

On election night on June 22, Abreu led the field with 27 percent of the vote, with four members of the opposing coalition coming in second through fifth. When ranked-choice votes and absentee ballots were taken into account two weeks later, Abreu maintained his lead, with 63 percent of the vote to Ordoñez's 37 percent; Abreu formally declared victory on July 2, and his opponents conceded in the succeeding days. In the November general election, Abreu won with over 88% of the vote.

Personal life
Abreu lives in Manhattan Valley. He is a member of UAW Local 3235, an association for legal aid attorneys.

References

Living people
1991 births
George Washington Educational Campus alumni
People from Washington Heights, Manhattan
Politicians from Manhattan
Columbia College (New York) alumni
Tulane University Law School alumni
American politicians of Dominican Republic descent
Lawyers from New York City
New York (state) Democrats